NGC 2617 is a Seyfert galaxy in the equatorial constellation of Hydra. It was discovered on February 12, 1885, by French astronomer Édouard Stephan. In 1888, Danish astronomer J. L. E. Dreyer described it as "extremely faint, very small, 2 very faint stars involved". It is located at an estimated distance of  million light years. In the infrared, the galaxy has an angular size of  arcminutes.

This is an almost face-on spiral galaxy with a morphological classification of Sc. In 1992, NGC 2617 was shown to be an extragalactic source of X-ray emission, and in 1996 it was identified as a Seyfert 1.8 galaxy by E. C. Moran and associates. A radio counterpart was found in 1998.

During April 2013, a dramatic outburst was discovered at the core of NGC 2617, and the spectral type was found to have changed to a Seyfert 1. An increase in X-ray emission was observed, followed by an increase in ultraviolet and then infrared luminosity. This event can be modeled by X-ray radiation heating the accretion disk orbiting a supermassive black hole (SMBH) at the center of the galaxy. This was followed by emission at longer wavelengths from the heated disk. An increase in luminosity between 2010 and 2012 may have cleared away dust in the inner part of the disk prior to the outburst, allowing a clearer view and changing the Seyfert type of the galaxy.

Additional outbursts were observed from 2016 to 2018, in between deep minima.

References

Further reading

Seyfert galaxies
Spiral galaxies
2608
Discoveries by Édouard Stephan